Jedd Ari Fisch (born May 5, 1976) is an American football coach who is currently the head football coach at the University of Arizona. Fisch previously served as the quarterbacks coach for the New England Patriots and as an assistant offensive coordinator and senior offensive assistant for the Los Angeles Rams. In addition, Fisch served as the interim head football coach at the University of California, Los Angeles (UCLA) for the final two games of the 2017 season.  He was the quarterbacks coach, wide receivers coach, and passing game coordinator under head coach Jim Harbaugh at the University of Michigan from 2015 to 2016. Fisch has served several stints as an assistant coach in both the professional and college ranks.

Early life
Fisch grew up in a Jewish family in Livingston, New Jersey and attended Hanover Park High School in nearby East Hanover Township. Fisch did not play football at the high school or college level, but instead was an all-state tennis player during his prep career.

Fisch graduated from the University of Florida in 1998 with a degree in criminology. He attended Florida almost solely for the opportunity to someday work for Florida head coach Steve Spurrier.

Fisch was also college roommates with Philadelphia Eagles general manager Howie Roseman.

Coaching career

Early career
Fisch embarked on a career in coaching while still in college as an undergraduate student. From 1997 to 1998, Fisch was the defensive coordinator for P. K. Yonge Developmental Research School in Gainesville, and he then spent one year (1998) with the New Jersey Red Dogs of the Arena Football League as a wide receivers/quality control coach.

Fisch got his break in coaching when he was named a graduate assistant coach for the Florida Gators football team under Spurrier from 1999 to 2000.  During this time, he earned his master's degree in sports management.

NFL assistant coach

Houston Texans
In 2002, Fisch was hired by the Houston Texans as a defensive quality control coach under head coach Dom Capers.

Baltimore Ravens
In 2004, Fisch then hired by the Baltimore Ravens under head coach Brian Billick, where he first served as a general offensive assistant for the 2004 season before being named assistant quarterbacks coach and assistant wide receivers coach for the 2005–2007 seasons. Fisch would not be retained under new head coach John Harbaugh.

Denver Broncos
In 2008, Fisch was hired by the Denver Broncos as their wide receivers coach under head coach Mike Shanahan. Under his tutelage, Brandon Marshall finished the season ranked third among NFL wide receivers in receptions (104), seventh in receiving yards (1,265), fifth in receiving yards per game (84.3), seventh in yards after the catch (419), third in catches that led to first downs (65) and first in number of times targeted for the second consecutive season (181). Marshall also finished first in fan voting for AFC wide receivers in the 2009 Pro Bowl. Rookie second round draft pick Eddie Royal also had a career season in 2008. Royal's 91 receptions are second most in NFL history for a rookie, behind only Anquan Boldin who had 101 receptions in 2003.  His 980 yards and five touchdowns are both Broncos rookie records, and sixth in the NFL in total yards. Fisch would not be retained under new head coach Josh McDaniels.

Seattle Seahawks
In 2010, after spending a year at the Minnesota Golden Gophers football, Fisch was hired by the Seattle Seahawks as their quarterbacks coach under head coach Pete Carroll. Fisch remained with the Seahawks for a season before returning to coach college football at Miami.

Jacksonville Jaguars
In 2013, Fisch returned to the NFL and was hired by the Jacksonville Jaguars as their offensive coordinator under head coach Gus Bradley. He was terminated from the Jaguars on December 30, 2014.

Los Angeles Rams
On January 24, 2018, after stints at Michigan and UCLA, Fisch was hired by the Los Angeles Rams as a senior offensive assistant under head coach Sean McVay, adding Fisch to their deep group of offensive coaches. Fisch operated as the Rams' clock-management specialist. Fisch and the Rams appeared in Super Bowl LIII, where they lost to the New England Patriots 13-3 in what was both a rematch of Super Bowl XXXVI and the lowest scoring Super Bowl in NFL history. He was promoted to assistant offensive coordinator for the 2019 season.

New England Patriots
On January 24, 2020, Fisch was hired by the New England Patriots as their quarterbacks coach under head coach Bill Belichick. 2 months after Fisch's arrival, long-time quarterback Tom Brady announced his departure from the Patriots after 20 years and would sign with the Tampa Bay Buccaneers on March 20, 2020. In April it was revealed that Fisch's title would be quarterbacks coach. In his lone season in New England, Fisch coached quarterbacks Cam Newton, Brian Hoyer, and Jarrett Stidham.

College assistant coach

Minnesota
In 2009, Fisch returned to the college game, serving a single season as offensive coordinator and quarterbacks coach for the Minnesota Golden Gophers football team under head coach Tim Brewster.

Miami
In 2011, Fisch joined the Miami Hurricanes football team as their offensive coordinator and quarterbacks coach under head coach Al Golden after a year with the Seattle Seahawks.

Michigan
On January 9, 2015, Fisch was hired by the Michigan Wolverines to serve as their quarterbacks coach, wide receivers coach, and passing game coordinator.  Fisch stated that he was drawn to a job at Michigan despite not having ties to incoming head coach Jim Harbaugh, the University, or the area.  However, he does have a long-standing coaching relationship with Vic Fangio, Harbaugh's defensive coordinator for four years with the San Francisco 49ers and one year with Stanford.

UCLA
On January 5, 2017, Fisch was hired by the UCLA Bruins as the team's offensive coordinator.

On November 19, 2017, Fisch was named head coach at UCLA for the remainder of the 2017 season after the firing of Jim L. Mora. With the Bruins at 5–6, Fisch guided the team to bowl eligibility, as they earned a 30–27 win over the likewise 5-6 California Golden Bears. As interim head coach, UCLA lost to Kansas State by a final score of 35–17 in the Cactus Bowl in Phoenix, Arizona, on December 26, 2017.

Head coach

Arizona
On December 23, 2020, Fisch was hired as the 32nd head coach at the University of Arizona. At the time of his hiring, Fisch was believed to be one of a handful of head coaches never to play college football.

Head coaching record

References

External links
 Arizona profile

1976 births
Living people
Arizona Wildcats football coaches
Cleveland Gladiators coaches
Baltimore Ravens coaches
Denver Broncos coaches
Florida Gators football coaches
Hanover Park High School alumni
High school football coaches in Florida
Houston Texans coaches
Jacksonville Jaguars coaches
Jewish American sportspeople
Los Angeles Rams coaches
Miami Hurricanes football coaches
Michigan Wolverines football coaches
Minnesota Golden Gophers football coaches
National Football League offensive coordinators
New England Patriots coaches
People from East Hanover, New Jersey
People from Livingston, New Jersey
Seattle Seahawks coaches
Sportspeople from Essex County, New Jersey
Sportspeople from Morris County, New Jersey
UCLA Bruins football coaches
21st-century American Jews